Burton Wadsworth Jones (1 October 1902 – 8 December 1983) was an American mathematician, known for his work on quadratic forms.

B. W. Jones was born in Redwood Falls, Minnesota. He received his BA in 1923 from Grinell College, his MA in 1924 from Harvard University, and his PhD in mathematics in 1928 from the University of Chicago under L. E. Dickson. Jones was a mathematics professor at Cornell University from 1930 to 1948. At Cornell, he supervised the doctoral dissertations of four mathematicians: Irma Moses Reiner (1946), Irving Reiner (1947), Mary Dolciani (1947), and William J. LeVeque (1948). Jones was a member of the University of Colorado Boulder faculty from 1948 to his retirement in 1971; he was chair of the mathematics department from 1949 to 1963.

Jones was honored by being selected to write the Carus Monograph Number 10, entitled The Arithmetic Theory of Quadratic Forms. He received the Mathematical Association of America (MAA) Distinguished Service Award in 1971. In 1991 the Rocky Mountain section of the MAA honored the memory of B. W. Jones by naming their yearly Distinguished Teaching Award after him. He died in Wellesley, Massachusetts.

Publications

with Gordon Pall: 

with William Hetherington Durfee: 
with Edward Harold Hadlock:

References

1902 births
1983 deaths
Cornell University faculty
University of Colorado Boulder faculty
20th-century American mathematicians
Number theorists
Grinnell College alumni
Harvard University alumni
University of Chicago alumni
People from Redwood Falls, Minnesota